Estothel, also known as Gatlin, is an unincorporated community in Covington County, Alabama, United States.

History
A post office operated under the name Gatlin from 1901 to 1905.

References

Unincorporated communities in Covington County, Alabama
Unincorporated communities in Alabama